Le Puy-Notre-Dame or Le Puy is a commune in the Maine-et-Loire department in western France.

The village is built on the hill of Puy, also spelt “Pua”.

Its inhabitants are known as Puechens.

History
Protohistoric traces have been found.

Le Puy (Podio beatae Mariae in the 7th century had become known as Puy-la-Montagne by 1793 and the hill of Puy as Mary's Mountain.  William 9th, Duke of Aquitaine is reputed to have brought back a waistband of the Virgin Mary from the Crusades and deposited it in the church.  His granddaughter Eleanor of Aquitaine founded a collegial church to honour the relic which, according to legend, facilitated pregnancies and male offspring.  Louis XI founded a chapter about 1480 and this became a site of pilgrimage the Sunday after 8 September, the Nativity.  The relic can still be viewed here.

The town became a stop on the pilgrimage to Santiago de Compostela (17th century houses used by the pilgrims still exist).

Its location between the territories of the Counts of Anjou and Aquitaine lent it strategic importance and traces of an encircling town wall remain.

Places
 Subterranean refuges exist under the town and Sanziers;
 Presshouse at the Château du Lys in Sanziers;
 Subterranean dovecote at La Hupponnière;
 Cavier mill in ruins;
 Ancient Franciscan convent chapel (barn).

Agriculture
Local agricultural production is mixed with vineyards (15 km²), orchards and market gardening taking place alongside pasture and woodlands.  Beekeeping also takes place.
The Cave Saint-Maur in Sanziers is known for its mushroom production.
Local A.O.C wines are Anjou, Saumur, and sparkling Saumur.

Administration

Miscellaneous
Puy derives from the Provençal word "Puech", meaning an isolated hill.

See also
 Communes of the Maine-et-Loire département

References

External links (in French, unless otherwise indicated)

 Tourism website
 Town Council website
 Le Puy-Notre-Dame on the Institut Géographique National site
 Weather for Le Puy-Notre-Dame
 Closest towns to Le Puy-Notre-Dame
 Personal page about Le Puy-Notre-Dame

Puynotredame